Siriroj Darasuriyong (RTGS: Sirirot Darasuriyong, born July 13, 1984 in Bangkok) is a track and field sprint athlete who competes internationally for Thailand.

Darasuriyong represented Thailand at the 2008 Summer Olympics in Beijing. He competed at the 4x100 metres relay together with Apinan Sukaphai, Sompote Suwannarangsri and Sittichai Suwonprateep. In their qualification heat they placed fifth in a time of 39.40 seconds and they were eliminated.

References

1984 births
Living people
Siriroj Darasuriyong
Siriroj Darasuriyong
Athletes (track and field) at the 2008 Summer Olympics
Siriroj Darasuriyong
Southeast Asian Games medalists in athletics
Siriroj Darasuriyong
Competitors at the 2007 Southeast Asian Games
Siriroj Darasuriyong